Derbyshire Dales is a constituency that has been represented in the House of Commons of the UK Parliament since 2019 by Sarah Dines of the Conservative Party. The constituency was created for the 2010 general election.

History
Following their review of parliamentary representation in Derbyshire, the Boundary Commission for England created a new constituency of Derbyshire Dales which is almost coterminous with the previous seat of West Derbyshire.

Constituency profile
The constituency is geographically large and mostly within the Peak District National Park. Its main settlements are Ashbourne, Bakewell and Matlock.

Boundaries

The District of Derbyshire Dales, and the Borough of Amber Valley wards of Alport, Crich, and South West Parishes.

Members of Parliament

Elections

Elections in the 2010s

See also
 List of parliamentary constituencies in Derbyshire

Notes

References

Parliamentary constituencies in Derbyshire
Constituencies of the Parliament of the United Kingdom established in 2010